Rud Zard or Rud-e Zard may refer to:
 Rud Zard-e Kayed Rafi, a village in Rud Zard Rural District, Iran
 Rud Zard-e Mashin, a village in Howmeh-ye Sharqi Rural District, Iran
 Rud Zard Rural District, a district in Iran